Dwij Yadav (born February 13, 1997 in Mumbai, India) is a former child actor in Bollywood. His first release was Nanhe Jaisalmer: A Dream Come True (2007), where he played the lead role Nanhe Jaisalmer/Vikram Singh, along with Bobby Deol.

In Samir Karnik's Heroes (2008), he was seen as young Jassi. This movie starred Salman Khan, Preity Zinta, Bobby Deol, Sohail Khan and many more......

In the movie Vaada Raha (2009), he had a strong role as Roshan. Bobby Deol and Kangana Ranaut are in this movie.

Sohail khan Productiön-‘’Kissan’’ (2009) was his next release.

The Shahid Kapoor-starrer Paathshala (2010) is his release.

Yadav stopped acting since 2011.

Filmography
2007 Nanhe Jaisalmer as Nanhe/Vikram Singh
2008 Heroes as Young Jassi
2009 Vaada Raha as Roshan
2009 Kisaan as Young Jiggar Singh
2010 Paathshala as Vijay Damodhar
2011 Cycle Kick as Deva

External links
 
 

Living people
21st-century Indian male child actors
Male actors in Hindi cinema
1999 births